The Path Of Zarathustra is a 2015 Indian magic realism film directed by Oorvazi Irani. It stars Oorvazi Irani, Tom Alter, Rushad Rana and Shishir Sharma. The screenplay of the movie is written by the celebrated author and writer of Parsi decent, Farrukh Dhondy. The film was released on 4 September 2015.

Plot
The film tells the journey of a young woman born into Zoroastrianism, the religion of her forefathers. Her journey starts with a remote village where she sees her grandfather die, to Mumbai, where she is welcomed by her aunt's adopted son who confesses that he still loves her. The film also in a unique manner brings back characters from the historical and philosophical past of Zoroastrianism such as Mani, executed by Parsi priests, Mazdak, executed for his radical communistic ideas and Zurvan, a theological avatar of 'Time'.

Cast
Oorvazi Irani
Tom Alter
Rushad Rana
Darius Shroff
Firdausi Jussawalla
Vivek Tandon

Production
The film is produced by SBI Impresario Pvt. Ltd. The company is a family held media production organization incorporated in 1975 by its current Managing Director and Chairman Sorab Irani. Oorvazi Irani his daughter as Director of the company is now along with her father carrying forward the company legacy as a filmmaker.

See also 
 On Wings of Fire

References

External links
 Official Website
 

2010s Hindi-language films
2015 films
Magic realism films
Films about Zoroastrianism
2010s English-language films